A list of home appliances typically includes a variety of electrical or mechanical devices used for various purposes in a household. Here are some common home appliances:

 Refrigerator: used for preserving food and beverages by maintaining a cool temperature.
 Oven: used for cooking and baking food.
 Air Fryer: An air fryer is a kitchen appliance that uses hot air to cook food, allowing you to fry, roast, bake, or grill without the need for excess oil. It works by circulating hot air around the food to cook it, creating a crispy outer layer while retaining the moisture inside.
 Microwave: used for heating and cooking food quickly.
 Dishwasher: used for cleaning dishes and utensils.
 Washing machine: used for washing clothes.
 Dryer: used for drying clothes.
 Vacuum cleaner: used for cleaning floors, carpets, and upholstery.
 Air conditioner: used for cooling and dehumidifying indoor air.
 Heater: used for heating indoor spaces.
 Iron: used for pressing and smoothing out wrinkles in clothes.
 Blender: used for blending and mixing food and drinks.
 Toaster: used for toasting bread.
 Coffee maker: used for brewing coffee.
 Kettle: used for boiling water.
 Electric fan: used for circulating air and keeping a room cool.

These are just a few examples of the many different home appliances that people use in their daily lives. A home appliance is a device which accomplishes household functions, such as cooking or cleaning. Home appliances can be classified into:
 Major appliances
 Small appliances
 Consumer electronics

See also

 Appliance recycling
 List of cooking appliances
 List of home automation topics
 List of ovens
 List of stoves
 List of vacuum cleaners
 Comparison of domestic robots

References

 
Technology-related lists